Trần Thanh Hải (born 18 September 1982) is a Vietnamese former badminton player from Ho Chi Minh City team. He won the men's doubles title at the 2006 National Championships partnered with Nguyễn Tiến Minh. He competed in four consecutive Southeast Asian Games, from 2001–2007, and was part of the national team that won the bronze medal in 2005. Trần also represented his country at the 2006 Asian Games and World Championships.

Achievements

IBF International 
Mixed doubles

References

External links 
 

1982 births
Living people
Sportspeople from Ho Chi Minh City
Vietnamese male badminton players
Badminton players at the 2006 Asian Games
Asian Games competitors for Vietnam
Competitors at the 2001 Southeast Asian Games
Competitors at the 2003 Southeast Asian Games
Competitors at the 2005 Southeast Asian Games
Competitors at the 2007 Southeast Asian Games
Southeast Asian Games bronze medalists for Vietnam
Southeast Asian Games medalists in badminton